Miller Township is an inactive township in Maries County, in the U.S. state of Missouri.

Miller Township took its name from nearby Miller County.

References

Townships in Missouri
Townships in Maries County, Missouri